The New Girlfriend and Other Stories is a short story collection by British writer Ruth Rendell. The title story won the MWA Edgar Award for Best Short Story of the Year in 1984.

Contents 
The collection contains 11 stories:
 The New Girlfriend
 A Dark Blue Perfume
 The Orchard Walls
 Hare's House
 Bribery and Corruption
 The Whistler
 The Convolvulus Clock
 Loopy
 Fen Hall
 Father's Day
 The Green Road to Quephanda

References

External links
 The New Girl Friend and other Stories of Suspense on Goodreads

1985 short story collections
Short story collections by Ruth Rendell
Hutchinson (publisher) books